

Current
The following people are commentators for TNT's coverage of the National Basketball Association.

Brian Anderson (play-by-play)
Greg Anthony (alternate analyst)
Charles Barkley (studio analyst)
Brent Barry (alternate analyst)
Jamal Crawford (Tuesday studio analyst)
Spero Dedes (play-by-play)
Ian Eagle (play-by-play)
Mike Fratello (analyst)
Kevin Frazier (alternate studio host)
Draymond Green (contributor)
Jared Greenberg (sideline reporter) 
Rebecca Haarlow (NBA Playoffs sideline reporter)
Kevin Harlan (lead play-by-play)
Brendan Haywood (alternate analyst)
Chris Haynes (sideline reporter) 
Grant Hill (analyst)
Jim Jackson (analyst) 
Ernie Johnson (lead studio host)
Nabil Karim (sideline reporter and alternate studio host) 
Allie LaForce (lead sideline reporter)
Kristen Ledlow (sideline reporter 2019-2021)
Adam Lefkoe (Tuesday and alternate studio host)
Kevin McHale (analyst)
Reggie Miller (co-lead analyst)
Shaquille O'Neal (studio analyst)
Candace Parker (Tuesday studio analyst and game analyst- select games starting in 2022)
Stephanie Ready (sideline reporter)
Dennis Scott (alternate analyst and sideline reporter)
Kenny Smith (studio analyst)
Steve Smith (alternate analyst)
Matt Winer (alternate studio host and Sideline Reporter for 2022 NBA Playoffs)
Stan Van Gundy (co-lead analyst)

Former

Danny Ainge: game analyst; former general manager of Boston Celtics
Marv Albert: lead play-by-play 1999-2021 (retired)
David Aldridge: lead sideline Reporter 
Rick Barry: game analyst
Gary Bender: alternate play-by-play- mostly NBA Playoffs
Tim Brando: play-by-play; now at Fox Sports 
Mike Breen: play-by-play (2002-2004); now at ESPN/ABC and MSG Network
Hubie Brown: game analyst (1990–2002); now at ESPN/ABC 
Bryan Burwell: sideline reporter (deceased)
Kevin Calabro: play-by-play; now at Root Sports Northwest, ESPN/ABC and Pac-12 Network
Chip Caray: play-by-play; now at Bally Sports South/Bally Sports Southeast
Skip Caray: play-by-play (deceased)
P. J. Carlesimo: alternate game analyst; now at ESPN/ABC and Pac-12 Network
Rex Chapman- analyst, 2004 and 2005 NBA Playoffs.
Doug Collins: color analyst (1989–1994, 2003–2010); now senior advisor of basketball operations of Chicago Bulls
Charles Davis- Sideline Reporter for NBA Playoffs 
Matt Devlin: alternate play-by-play- mostly NBA Playoffs; now at TSN and Sportsnet
Mike Dunleavy Sr.: alternate game analyst- NBA playoffs only
Jim Durham: play-by-play (deceased)
Marc Fein: sideline reporter- NBA playoffs/substitute studio host
Kevin Garnett: studio analyst, 2016-2018 
Rosalyn Gold-Onwude- sideline reporter, 2017 to 2019; now at ESPN.
Jen Hale- sideline reporter 1st round of 2017 NBA Playoffs.
Gus Johnson: play-by-play– 2022 NBA playoffs only; now at Fox Sports 
Magic Johnson: guest studio analyst (2002–2008)
Lewis Johnson - alternate sideline- mostly NBA Playoffs (2011–2017); now at NBC Sports and Pac-12 Network
Steve Kerr: lead analyst (2003–2007, 2010–2014); now head coach of Golden State Warriors
 Dei Lynam – Sideline NBA Playoffs 2010-2015
Joel Meyers- 1st round of 2014, 2020 and 2021 NBA Playoffs; now announcer for New Orleans Pelicans
Cheryl Miller: sideline reporter, analyst (1997–2013) now women's basketball head coach at CSULA
Bob Neal: play-by-play
Rachel Nichols: sideline reporter
Pam Oliver- sideline- NBA playoffs (2004–2009)
Doc Rivers: game analyst- NBA Playoffs only now, head coach of Philadelphia 76ers
Jalen Rose: sideline reporter- 2006 NBA playoffs only now at ESPN/ABC
Craig Sager: sideline reporter (1996–2016); deceased
Flip Saunders- 2nd analyst on #1 team for 1st round of 2014 NBA Playoffs (deceased)
Dick Stockton (alternate play-by-play)
Molly Sullivan- sideline- 1st round of 2014 NBA playoffs
Marty Snider- Sideline Reporter
Reggie Theus: studio analyst, 
John Thompson: game analyst (deceased)
Ron Thulin: play-by-play
Pete Van Wieren: play-by-play (deceased)
Jeff Van Gundy: game analyst (2002–2003)- NBA playoffs only-now at ESPN/ABC
Dwyane Wade: Tuesday studio analyst (2019–2022)
Bill Walton: game analyst; now at ESPN/ABC and Pac-12 Network
Chris Webber: co-lead analyst and fill-in Studio analyst (2008–2021)
Tracy Wolfson: sideline- alternate NBA regular season and NBA playoffs (2011–2016); now at CBS Sports
Chris Bosh: Studio Analyst-2019
Bob Fitzgerald (1st round of 2020 NBA Playoffs only)
Steve Nash: (Tuesday contributor); now head coach of Brooklyn Nets

Spanish

Games are available in Spanish on SAP
José Ángel Medellín
Marcelo Godoy
Pete Manzano
Fernando Palacios

References

TNT announcing teams
TNT announcing teams
NBA on TNT broadcasters